Arachnospila consobrina is a little-known Palaearctic spider wasp.

Description
Like other members of the sub-genus Ammosphex this is a medium-sized red and black spider wasp. The males have a quite distinctive genital plate, but females are very similar to related species such as A. anceps and A.trivialis but can be identified by their relatively hairier head.

Distribution
Northern and central Europe, marginally in southern Britain, and also Africa and Asia.

Biology
A consobrina is single brooded, flying in July and August.  The only observation of A. consobrina with prey concerns a female found under a stone near Constantinople carrying a Segestria florentina which was reported in Fahringer.  The nesting biology of A. consobrina is almost completely unknown, but like other Arachnospila species in the sub-genus Ammosphex it is adapted to digging in loose sandy soils.

References

Hymenoptera of Europe
Pompilinae
Insects described in 1843
Taxa named by Anders Gustaf Dahlbom